Neen Savage is a civil parish and a hamlet in south east Shropshire, England. It is situated north of the small market town of Cleobury Mortimer. The River Rea, which was historically known as the River Neen, flows past the hamlet, and a notable ford exists.

The village contains a parish church, in whose churchyard stands the local war memorial in form of a square stone cross.

London publisher Thomas Adams (c1566-1620) was son of a yeoman farmer of Neen Savage.

In 2016 the population of Neen Savage was estimated to be just under 300.

See also
Listed buildings in Neen Savage

References

External links

Hamlets in Shropshire
Civil parishes in Shropshire